The 1992–93 Primera División season was the second category of the Spanish basketball league system during the 1992–93 season. It was the third played with the name of Primera División.

Format
32 teams played this season and were divided into two groups of 16 teams called Group A and Group B.

First Phase
Group A, teams that the previous season earned their place in the category. They play all against all to two turns.
Group B, teams that the previous season had relegated, were re-caught or invited. They play all against all to two turns.

Second Phase
Group A1, made up of those classified in the 1st, 4th, 5th, 8th and 9th positions of group A and 2nd of B.
Group A2, made up of those classified in the 2nd, 3rd, 6th, 7th and 10th positions of group A and 1st of B.
Group B1, made up of those classified in the 11th and 16th positions of group A plus the 5th and 6th of B.
Group B2, made up of those classified in 12th place of group A plus 4th, 7th and 12th of B.
Group B3, made up of those classified in the 13th position of group A plus the 3rd, 8th and 11th of B.
Group B4, made up of those classified in the 14th and 15th positions of group A plus 9th and 10th of B.

The top 4 finishers of groups A1 and A2 play two rounds of qualifying for promotion playoffs, to the best of 3 matches (the second and third matches are played at the home of the best classified in the previous phase) the first and at best of 5 the second (the first, second and fifth matches are played at the home of the best classified in the previous phase). The winners go up to the ACB League. In addition, the promoted players play a round-trip tie to determine the category champion.
The 1st classified of groups B1, B2, B3 and B4 earn the right to be the following season in group A.
The last 4 classified in group B go down directly to the Segunda División.

Teams

Promotion and relegation (pre-season) 
A total of 32 teams contested the league, including 11 sides from the 1991–92 season, three relegated from the 1991–92 ACB, four promoted from the Segunda División and fourteen Wild Cards.

Teams relegated from Liga ACB
Gran Canaria
CB Granada
Collado Villalba, who resigned to participate in 1992–93 ACB season.

Teams promoted from Segunda División
Tano Gandía
Europolis Las Rozas
Baloncesto Fuenlabrada
Loyola Easo

Wild Cards
CB Melilla, who obtained a relegation place the previous season.
Centre Comercial Llobregat
Conservas Daroca
UDEA Algeciras
Down Tarragona
CB Mataró
Caja Cantabria
CAB Loja
Cajasur Córdoba
CB Castellón
Unicaja Mayoral
CB Vetusta
San Isidro
Hyundai Nautico
Pan de Azucar Zamora

Venues and locations

First phase

Group A

Group B

Second phase

Group A1

Group A2

Group B1

Group B2

Group B3

Group B4

Promotion Playoffs
The two winners of the semifinals are promoted to Liga ACB.

Final standings

References

External links
League at JM Almenzar website

Primera División B de Baloncesto
1992–93 in Spanish basketball
Second level Spanish basketball league seasons